The 1907–08 FA Cup was the 37th staging of the world's oldest association football competition, the Football Association Challenge Cup (more usually known as the FA Cup). Wolverhampton Wanderers won the competition for the second time, beating Newcastle United 3–1 in the final at Crystal Palace.

Matches were scheduled to be played at the stadium of the team named first on the date specified for each round, which was always a Saturday. If scores were level after 90 minutes had been played, a replay would take place at the stadium of the second-named team later the same week. If the replayed match was drawn further replays would be held at neutral venues until a winner was determined. If scores were level after 90 minutes had been played in a replay, a 30-minute period of extra time would be played.

Thirteen of the First Division's twenty clubs were defeated by lower division opposition; this figure remains a record number for a single season. Three of the four semi finalists were from outside the elite division and the cup itself was won by a second tier club.

Calendar
The format of the FA Cup for the season had a preliminary round, five qualifying rounds, four proper rounds, and the semi finals and final.

First round proper
36 of the 40 clubs from the First and Second divisions joined the 12 clubs who came through the qualifying rounds. Of the League sides not exempt to this round, Oldham Athletic, Glossop and Chesterfield were put into the Fifth Qualifying Round, and each one won. Clapton Orient were placed in the preliminary round, and won through to the Third Qualifying Round before losing to Southend United. Nine non-league clubs joined the three League sides in winning through to the first round Proper.

Sixteen non-league sides were exempt to the first round to bring the total number of teams up to 64. These were:

32 matches were scheduled to be played on Saturday 11 January 1908. Eight matches were drawn and went to replays in the following midweek, of which one went to a second replay.

Second round proper
The sixteen second round matches were played on Saturday 1 February 1908. Five matches were drawn, with the replays taking place in the following midweek. One of these, the Stoke against Gainsborough Trinity match, went to a second replay the following week.

Third round proper
The eight third-round matches were scheduled for Saturday 22 February 1908. There were two replays, played in the following midweek.

Fourth round proper
The four quarter final matches were scheduled for Saturday 7 March 1908. The Everton against Southampton game was drawn, and replayed on 11 March.

Semi-finals

The semi-final matches were played on Saturday 28 March 1908. Newcastle United won their tie against Fulham 6–0, which remains a record for an FA Cup semi-final. In the other tie, Wolverhampton Wanderers won against Southampton to meet Newcastle in the final.

Final

The Final was contested by Wolverhampton Wanderers and Newcastle United at Crystal Palace. Newcastle had just finished 4th in the First Division during this season, after two successive league titles and this was their third FA Cup final appearance in 4 years (although they had yet to win). Their 6–0 thrashing of Fulham in the semi-final is a record win for a semi final. By contrast, Wolves had finished 9th in the Second Division.

Nevertheless, Wolves upset the odds by winning the match 3–1, with goals by Kenneth Hunt, George Hedley and Billy Harrison. James Howey scored the Magpies' reply. The Lord Mayor of London, Sir John Bell, then handed the trophy to Wolves' captain, Billy Wooldridge.

Match details

See also
FA Cup Final Results 1872-

References
General
Official site; fixtures and results service at TheFA.com
1907-08 FA Cup at rsssf.com
1907-08 FA Cup at soccerbase.com

Specific

1907-08
FA
Cup